Eduard Marcel Núñez Mejía (born 21 May 1991 in Santo Domingo) is a Dominican football player who recently played for CE Vilassar de Dalt.

He is the younger brother of Pedro Antonio Núñez and the half-brother of Mariano Díaz Mejía.

International career
Edu is a defender and  he has made a cap in the Dominican Republic.

References

External links

1991 births
Living people
Sportspeople from Santo Domingo
Dominican Republic footballers
Association football fullbacks
Divisiones Regionales de Fútbol players
Dominican Republic international footballers
Dominican Republic expatriate footballers
Dominican Republic expatriate sportspeople in Spain
Expatriate footballers in Spain